The water polo tournament at the 2018 Mediterranean Games in Tarragona took place between 27 June and 1 July at the Campclar Aquatic Centre.

Medal summary

Events

Medal table

References

External links
2018 Mediterranean Games – Water polo Archived
2018 Mediterranean Games - Tarragona / Spain, Results, p. 43-44.

 
Sports at the 2018 Mediterranean Games
2018
Mediterranean Games
Mediterranean Games